Knut Andreas Knudsen (26 October 1919 – 10 April 2001) was a Norwegian shipowner and a politician for the Liberal Party. Born in Gjerpen, he was a son of shipowner Christen Knudsen (1884–1986) and a grandson of Gunnar Knudsen.

He served as a deputy representative to the Norwegian Parliament from Telemark during the terms 1961–1965 and 1965–1969.

Knudsen was a member of the executive committee of Gjerpen municipality council from 1955 to 1963. Then, Gjerpen was incorporated into Skien, and Knudsen held the same post in Skien from 1963 to 1975.

References

1919 births
2001 deaths
Deputy members of the Storting
Liberal Party (Norway) politicians
Politicians from Skien
Norwegian School of Economics alumni